Ewart Beckford OD (20 September 1941 – 17 February 2021), known by the stage name U-Roy, was a Jamaican vocalist and pioneer of toasting. U-Roy was known for a melodic style of toasting applied with a highly developed sense of timing.

Early life
Ewart Beckford was born in Jones Town, Saint Andrews Parish, Kingston, Jamaica, on 21 September 1942. He was raised within a religious and musical family; his mother was an organist for the choir at a local Seventh-day Adventist church. The sobriquet U-Roy originated from a younger member of his family who found it difficult to pronounce his first name. Beckford attended Denham Town High School in Kingston. As a young man Beckford listened to the music of Louis Prima, James Brown, Ruth Brown, Fats Domino, Rufus Thomas, Smiley Lewis and was especially influenced by the vocal phrasing of Louis Jordan.

Career
Inspired by Count Matchuki he started his professional career as a Deejay in 1961 on Dickie Wong's sound system (originally called Doctor Dickies later changed to Dickies Dynamic) moving later to the Sir George the Atomic sound system. Beckford then worked on Sir Coxsone Dodd's sound system where he ran the number two set while King Stitt "The Ugly One" ran the main set. This was followed by a period with Sir Percy before he moved to King Tubby's Hometown Hi-Fi sound system. Beckford's first single "Dynamic Fashion Way" (1969) was a Keith Hudson production. It was followed by the Lee "Scratch" Perry production "Earth's Rightful Ruler" with Peter Tosh.

In 1970, Jamaican singer John Holt (lead vocalist of the Paragons) heard Beckford toasting over a Duke Reid track at a dance. Holt told Reid about the performance and on his recommendation Reid asked Beckford to come and see him and an informal recording deal was arranged. Beckford's first two singles released on Duke Reid's Treasure Isle label, "Wake the Town" (1970) and "Wear You to the Ball" (1970), were Jamaican hits and established his reputation as one of Jamaica's most popular toasters. Beckford then went on to work with other major producers on the island including Lee "Scratch" Perry, Bunny Lee, Phil Pratt, Sonia Pottinger, Rupie Edwards, Alvin Ranglin and Lloyd Daley. 1971 saw the release of Beckford's Deejay version of The Paragons' "The Tide Is High". Beckford first toured the UK in 1972 with the artists Roy Shirley and Max Romeo. The tour was organized by Rita and Benny King; the owners of R & B Records based in Stamford Hill, London.

Beckford's album Dread in a Babylon was released in the US, Europe and Jamaica by Virgin Records in 1975. The album achieved significant sales in the UK which was due in part to the ongoing expansion of the Virgin label and stores. The track "Runaway Girl" from the album was released as a single in Europe that same year.  The success of Dread in a Babylon led to a series of Tony Robinson produced albums: Natty Rebel (1976), Rasta Ambassador (1977) and Jah Son of Africa (1978).  Beckford's international popularity led to the album Natty Rebel being released in 1976 on Virgin's imprint Front Line label in Nigeria as well as in France on Virgin and Polydor.

Beckford started his own sound system in 1978, which he named Stur Gav after his sons.  The sound system would launch the careers of a younger generation of toasters and singers including Ranking Joe, Jah Screw, Charlie Chaplin and Josey Wales.  The pop group Blondie had a world-wide hit with the reggae track "The Tide Is High" in 1980, which prompted Virgin to re-release the original Paragons' track from 1967 and the 1971 U-Roy version as a single that same year.  His album Pray Fi Di People was released in 2012.

Beckford was featured on the album True Love by Toots and the Maytals, which won the Grammy Award in 2004 for Best Reggae Album, and showcased many notable musicians including Willie Nelson, Eric Clapton, Jeff Beck, Trey Anastasio, Gwen Stefani / No Doubt, Ben Harper, Bonnie Raitt, Manu Chao, The Roots, Ryan Adams, Keith Richards, Toots Hibbert, Paul Douglas, Jackie Jackson, Ken Boothe, and The Skatalites.

Beckford was awarded the Order of Distinction in 2007 by the Jamaican government for his contribution to music.

U-Roy's music and Rastafari
Rastafari has been a feature of Beckford's lyrics from his earliest singles to his latest album Pray Fi Di People. Beckford's second single "Rightful Ruler" (1969) opens with a profession of Rastafari faith given in the Ethiopian language Amharic:

Kibir amlak (Glory to Jah)
Qedamawi ras fetari (First creator)
Qedamawi iyesus kristos (Holy Jesus Christ)
Lebdama mabrak isad
Tenayistilgn (Greetings)

Beckford's "Joyful Locks" (1975) is a DJ version of Linval Thompson's "Don't Cut Off Your Dreadlocks"; an encouragement to others to keep their dreadlocks and to "let it grow". The original song and Beckford's DJ version both allude to the biblical Samson who as a Nazarite was expected to make certain religious vows including the ritual treatment of his hair as described in Chapter Six of the Book of Numbers:

All the days of the vow of his separation there shall no razor come upon his head: until the days be fulfilled, in the which he separateth himself unto the Lord, he shall be holy, and shall let the locks of the hair of his head grow.

Death
Beckford's death was confirmed on 17 February 2021 when his partner, Marcia Smikle, told the Jamaican newspaper The Gleaner. Trojan Records was also informed about his death. While no cause of death was made public at the time, he suffered from diabetes, hypertension, and problems with his kidneys prior to his death, and had been undergoing surgery at the hospital.

Legacy
Beckford was preceded by the toasters Count Matchuki, King Stitt and Sir Lord Comic who themselves were influenced by the jive talk of the US disc jockeys that they heard on American radio stations whose broadcasts reached the Caribbean. Beckford was the first toaster to popularize the form through a series of successful releases on the Duke Reid label gaining a wider audience for toasting. This approach to production and the remixing of previously recorded tracks with a new vocal influenced the early hip-hop pioneers. Kool Herc states:

"Hip-hop….the whole chemistry of that came from Jamaica…..In Jamaica all you needed was a drum and a bass. So what I did was go right to the ‘yoke’. I cut off all the anticipation and just played the beats. I’d find out where the break in the record was and prolonged it and people would love it. So I was giving them their own taste and beat percussion wise….cause my music is all about heavy bass."

Many internationally known dancehall deejays have acknowledged U-Roy as an influence on their careers, including Sean Paul and Shabba Ranks.

Album discography

Version Galore (1970)
Version Galore Vol. 2 (1972)
U Roy (1974)
Dread in a Babylon (1975) – produced by Prince Tony Robinson
Natty Rebel (1976)
The Best of U Roy (1976)
Right Time Rockers-The Lost Album (1976) 
African Roots (1976)
Rasta Ambassador (1977)
Jah Son of Africa (1978)
With Words of Wisdom (1979)
The Originator (1980)
Love Gamble (1980)
Line Up and Come (1986)
 Music Addict  (1987) - produced by Prince Jazzbo
True Born African (1991) – produced by Mad Professor
Smile a While (1993) – produced by Mad Professor
Babylon Kingdom Must Fall (1996) – produced by Mad Professor
Reggae Live Sessions Vol-1 (1998)
Serious Matter (2000)
Now (2001) – produced by Guillaume Bougard/Pierre Simonin
Rebel in Styylle (2005) – Mediacom
Old School/New Rules (2007) – produced by Mad Professor
Pray Fi Di People (2012) – produced by Ewart Beckford
Talking Roots (2018) – produced by Mad Professor
Solid Gold U-Roy (2021) 
Dread In A Africa U-Roy (2022) Jamaican Art Records

References

External links
Smokeyroom's Version Galore
[ U-Roy biography] at the AllMusic website
 
Natty Rebel (1976) Nigerian release at Discogs
"Joyful Locks" (1975) Bunny Lee production at Discogs
U-Roy Live & Interview
"Heavy Duty" (2016) at Spotify
 

1942 births
2021 deaths
Jamaican Rastafarians
Jamaican reggae musicians
Musicians from Kingston, Jamaica
Performers of Rastafarian music
Recipients of the Order of Distinction
Trojan Records artists
Former Seventh-day Adventists
Converts to the Rastafari movement
Jamaican former Christians
Virgin Records artists